is a Japanese film and television actor. He was a regular cast member of Fuji TV's Operation Love, appearing in all 11 episodes broadcast in 2007 and the 2008 special, and receiving an award for his role. He has made numerous other TV appearances.

Filmography

Television
Hitoribocchi no Kimi ni as Hibino Yudai (TBS, 1998)
Heisei Meoto Jawan (NTV, 2000)
Zoku Heisei Meoto Jawan (NTV, 2002)
Kinpachi-sensei 7 as Kano Shintaro (TBS, 2004)
Taiyo no Uta as Kato Haruo (TBS, 2006)
Teppan Shoujo Akane!! as Hamada Shingo (TBS, 2006, ep2)
Kanojo to no Tadashii Asobikata as Mizuno Hideaki (TV Asahi, 2007)
Sumire no Hana Saku Koro as Takai Yusuke (NHK, 2007)
Loss Time Life Wife of a Mob Member (Fuji TV, 2008, Story 7)
Hachimitsu to Clover as Rokutaro (Fuji TV, 2008, ep 8,11)
Taiyo to Umi no Kyoshitsu (Fuji TV, 2008)
33pun Tantei (Fuji TV, 2008, ep4)
Nene: Onna Taikōki (TV Tokyo, 2009) – Toyotomi Hidetsugu
Chance! (Fuji TV, 2009)
Ueno Juri to Itsutsu no Kaban Aruasa, Hinata wa Totsuzen ni (Wowow, 2009)
Samurai High School - ep04 (NTV, 2009)
Code Blue Season 2 - ep03 (Man whose body pierce by Ski) (Fuji TV, 2010)
Taro no To (NHK, 2011) – young Tarō Okamoto
Gunshi Kanbei (NHK, 2014) – Kuriyama Zenzuke
Aoi Honō (TV Tokyo, 2014) – Toshio Okada
Hero (Fuji TV, 2014)
Nobunaga Concerto (Fuji TV, 2014) – Tokugawa Ieyasu
Tsuribaka Nisshi (TV Tokyo, 2015) – Hama-chan
Totto TV (NHK, 2016) – Ijūin
Warotenka (NHK, 2017) – Fūta Takei
Solitary Gourmet (TV Tokyo, 2017) – Hama-chan
In Hand (TBS, 2019)
Earwig and the Witch (NHK, 2020) – Thomas (voice)
The Supporting Actors 3 (TV Tokyo, 2021) – Himself
Awaiting Kirin (NHK, 2021) – Kuroda Kanbei
Come Come Everybody (NHK, 2021) – Santa Tachibana
Shin Shinchō Kōki (NTV, 2022) – Kanbei Kuroda
First Love (Netflix, 2022)
 Kamen Rider Black Sun (Amazon Prime Video, 2022) – Whale Monster

Films
Ultraman Tiga & Ultraman Dyna & Ultraman Gaia: Battle in Hyperspace (1999)
Shiroi Fune (2002)
The Star of Prefecture Government (2006)
Catch a Wave (2006)
Aoi uta - Nodo jiman Seishun hen (2006)
Sugar & Spice: Fuumi Zekka (2006)
Ahiru Kamo no Coin Locker (2007)
Fish Story (2009)
Kamogawa Horumo (2009)
A Good Husband (2010)
Robo-G (2012)
See you tomorrow, everyone (2013)
The Eternal Zero (2013)
Sake-Bomb (2013)
A Boy Called H (2013)
Lady Maiko (2014)
In His Chart 2 (2014)
The Great Shu Ra Ra Boom (2014)
Miss Hokusai (2015) – Zenjirō Ikeda (voice)
Tensai Bakavon: Yomigaeru Flanders no Inu (2015)
Hero (2015) – Daisuke Uno
Good Morning Show (2016)
Nobunaga Concerto (2016) – Tokugawa Ieyasu
Himeanole (2016) – Susumu Okada
If Cats Disappeared From the World (2016) – Tsutaya
The Magnificent Nine (2016) – Narrator
One Piece Film: Gold (2016) – Tanaka (voice)
Honnō-ji Hotel (2017) – Mori Ranmaru
Pokémon the Movie: Everyone's Story (2018)
Masquerade Hotel (2019)
Samurai Shifters (2019)
The 47 Ronin in Debt (2019) – Ōtaka Gengo
The Hikita's Are Expecting! (2019) – Sugiura
A Beloved Wife (2020) – Sugiura
Good-Bye (2020) – Nobuhiko Kiyokawa
The Confidence Man JP: Episode of the Princess (2020) – Eugene
Ora, Ora Be Goin' Alone (2020)
The Supporting Actors: The Movie (2021) – Himself
Every Trick in the Book (2021) – Horinouchi
Shrieking in the Rain (2021) – Kaneko
What to Do with the Dead Kaiju? (2022) – Masahiko Amane
Deemo: Memorial Keys (2022) – Mirai (voice)
Tombi: Father and Son (2022)
Homestay (2022)
7 Secretaries: The Movie (2022)
Yudō (2023) – Gorō Miura

Awards 
 11th Nikkan Sports Drama Grand Prix (Apr-Jun 2007): Best Supporting Actor for his performance in Operation Love.

Notes

External links 
 
 
 
 
 Gaku Hamada's official blog
 Gaku Hamada's profile at Stardust Promotion
 Interview with Gaku Hamada at the official Operation Love website

1988 births
Living people
Male actors from Tokyo
Stardust Promotion artists